The Federation of South Arabia, also known as the FSA was a federal state under British protection in what would become South Yemen.  Its capital was Aden.

History 
It was formed on 4 April 1962 from the 15 protected states of the Federation of Arab Emirates of the South. The State of Aden, formerly Aden Colony, joined the Federation on 18 January 1963. In June 1964, the Upper Aulaqi Sultanate was added for a total of 17 states. A team was sent to the 1966 Commonwealth Games in Kingston, Jamaica.  The Federation was abolished on 30 November 1967, when its status as a British protectorate came to an end, along with that of the Protectorate of South Arabia, and they became the People's Democratic Republic of Yemen.

States

List of rulers

Chief Ministers
 Hassan Ali Bayumi (18 January 1963 – 24 June 1963)
 Zayn Abdu Baharun (9 July 1963 – 23 January 1965)
 Abdul-Qawi Hassan Makkawi (7 March 1965 – 25 September 1965)
 Ali Musa al-Babakr (25 September 1965 – 30 August 1966)
 Salih al-Awadli (30 August 1966 – 30 November 1967)

High Commissioners

 Sir Charles Johnston (18 January 1963 – 17 July 1963)
 Sir Kennedy Trevaskis (17 July 1963 – 21 December 1964)
 Sir Richard Turnbull (21 December 1964 – 22 May 1967)
 Sir Humphrey Trevelyan (22 May 1967 – 30 November 1967)

Postage stamps

The Federation issued its own Adeni postage stamps from 1963 to 1966. Most of its issues were part of the omnibus issues common to all the Commonwealth territories, but it did issue its own definitive stamps on 1 April 1965. The set of 14 included 10 values, from 5 to 75 fils, each depicting the arms of the Federation in a single color, while the top four values (100 fils, 250 fils, 500 fils, and 1 dinar), featured the flag of the Federation.

The stamps referred to above are those listed in the Scott Standard Postage Stamp Catalog.  A number of other stamps have also been issued and are listed in Stanley Gibbons and other widely used stamp catalogs.  It is possible, or even likely, that some of the stamps of South Arabia were not issued primarily for postal use.

See also
 United Nations Security Council Resolution 188

References

Further reading
 Paul Dresch. A History of Modern Yemen. Cambridge, UK: Cambridge University Press, 2000.
 R.J. Gavin. Aden Under British Rule: 1839-1967. London: C. Hurst & Company, 1975.
 Tom Little. South Arabia: Arena of Conflict. London: Pall Mall Press, 1968.

External links

 South Arabia and Yemen, 1945-1995

 
20th century in Yemen
Former countries in the Middle East
Gulf of Aden
Philately of Yemen
States and territories established in 1962
South Yemen
United Kingdom–Yemen relations
South Arabia
Former monarchies
Former British protectorates